Jeder Rappen zählt (JRZ) (literally Every rappen (nickel) counts) is the Swiss version of the Serious Request that broadcasts on Dutch radio/television.  

The Dutch campaign started in 2004, and in 2009 the German Swiss station joined in with a similar format and subjects. The show appeals for money which each year helps a certain cause is broadcast on Schweizer Radio und Fernsehen (SRF) s' Radio SRF 3 SRF zwei also broadcasts part of the campaign. 

A number of radio or television personalities are locked inside a glass house and they run broadcasts from there broadcast live on major radio stations. Every year, a special topic is chosen and funds collected donated to that specific cause.

In 2007, Geneva-based Couleur 3 radio station had organized a similar campaign called Couleur Terre for one year in French language.

Summary

was replaced by Tina Nägeli after two days into the show because of suffering from Laryngitis

External links
Official website

 

2009 radio programme debuts
Charities based in Switzerland
Swiss radio programmes